Bayap Zoo is a zoo located in the Kamchay Mear District of Prey Veng Province, in Cambodia.

History

The zoo was established in 1995, by Senator Nhim Vanda, who  owned it, and also the Kampot Zoo in Kampot city of southern Cambodia.

The Bayap Zoo was destroyed by flood in 2010–2011, and was renovated and reopened.

Criticism

The zoo has been accused of keeping its animals in poor conditions, and the organization Zoo Watch has called for it to be shut down. Vanda has denied that animals were being mistreated, saying conditions have improved.

References

Zoos in Cambodia
Buildings and structures in Prey Veng province
Parks in Cambodia
Tourist attractions in Prey Veng province
Zoos established in 1995